John Catterick (died 1419) was a medieval Bishop of St David's, Bishop of Coventry and Lichfield, and Bishop of Exeter.

Catterick was consecrated Bishop of St David's in the early part of 1414, and translated to the Diocese of Coventry and Lichfield on 1 February 1415. He was then transferred to the Diocese of Exeter on 20 November 1419.

Catterick died as Bishop of Exeter on 28 December 1419.

Catterick's tombstone is in Santa Croce in Florence.

Notes

Citations

References

 

15th-century English Roman Catholic bishops
Bishops of Lichfield
Bishops of Exeter
Bishops of St Davids
14th-century births
1419 deaths

People from Richmondshire (district)
People from Catterick, North Yorkshire
Year of birth unknown